Juodšiliai Eldership is an eldership in Lithuania, located in Vilnius District Municipality, south of Vilnius.

Etymology 
The name Juodšiliai means "the black groves" . The village was named  sometime after 1920, and takes its name from the surrounding coniferous forests.

Geography and nature 
Rudaminėlė, a tributary of Vokė, flows along the northwest border of the eldership.

History 
The settlement appeared relatively recently. Until World War I, the area was a forest (named Juodasis Šilas), which was felled by German soldiers. A railway was laid to transport the timber, and a train station was built nearby.

The cleared space near the railway gave rise to a railroad worker village Reslerava.

The scenic area was favoured by the intelligentsia of Vilnius, and a campsite was built there.

In 1919, a school was opened in the village, and a monastery worked between 1920 and 1939. An orphanage also worked from 1924 to 1946.

The construction of a church was started in 1936, but was halted due to the war. After it, the church building was used to establish a foster home, later a hospital, but a fire in 1991 damaged the building. In 2001, the church was returned to its original purpose, and the church was officially inaugurated in 2016.

Populated places 
9 villages are located in the eldership, the largest of which are Juodšiliai and Valčiūnai.

Notable locations 

 Juodšiliai Church of the Blessed Mykolas Sopočka
 Juodšiliai tumulus
 Dusinėnai tumuli
 Prūdiškės Manor ruins
 Writer Józef Mackiewicz farmhouse in Juodšiliai
 Kelmytė ancient charcoal-burning place

Ethnic composition 
According to the 2011 census:

 Polish - 46.1%
 Lithuanian - 27.9%
 Russian - 13.7%
 Belarusian - 6.8%

Notable people 

 Uršulė Leduchovska (1865-1939), nun, actively helped the impoverished and young women. Recognized as a saint in 2003.
 Mykolas Sopočka (1880-1975), catholic priest, professor of theology, who sheltered in the village from Soviet deportations.
 Józef Mackiewicz (1902-1985), Polish writer, publicist and politician. Lived in Juodšiliai during the Soviet occupation.

Gallery

References 

Elderships in Vilnius District Municipality